Pat Deans (born 28 September 1980, Dublin) is an Irish footballer.

A centre half/midfielder, Deans made his League of Ireland debut for Shamrock Rovers at UCD on 2 April 2000. He made his Rovers debut at Bray in the League Cup on 5 October 1999.

He was Rovers 'Young Player of the Year' in 2000/01, when he scored four goals in 28 appearances. His first goal for the club was against St Pats in December 2000.

He also made one appearance for Rovers in European competitions, but Deans left the club at the end of the 2004 season.

Honours
SRFC Young Player of the Year:
 Shamrock Rovers – 2000/01

References

1980 births
League of Ireland players
Living people
Republic of Ireland association footballers
Shamrock Rovers F.C. players
Association footballers from County Dublin
Association football midfielders